Podocarpus bracteatus is a species of conifer in the family Podocarpaceae. It is found only in Indonesia.

References

bracteatus
Least concern plants
Taxonomy articles created by Polbot